George William Penrose, Lord Penrose, PC (born 2 June 1938), is a Scottish judge (from 1990) and member of the Privy Council (from 2000) who sat in the Court of Session, the supreme civil court.

He is best known for heading The Penrose Report into the near-collapse of the mutual life assurance company Equitable Life. In 2001, Lord Penrose was asked by the Treasury to investigate the history of the company. His 818-page report was published on 8 March 2004. He also headed the Penrose Inquiry into Hepatitis C & HIV infections from NHS Scotland treatment with blood and blood products such as Factor VIII.

References

External links 
 "Q&A: Penrose Inquiry" on the BBC News website, dated 8 March 2004
 "Timeline: Equitable Life scandal" on the BBC News website, dated 8 March 2004

1938 births
Members of the Privy Council of the United Kingdom
Living people
Penrose